is an athletic stadium in Ōgaki, Gifu, Japan.

It was used J2 League game between FC Gifu and Gainare Tottori on September 22, 2013.

References

External links
Official site

FC Gifu
Sports venues in Gifu Prefecture
Football venues in Japan
Ōgaki
Sports venues completed in 1987
1987 establishments in Japan